Amrabad, Zahedan is a village in Shuru Rural District, in the Nosratabad of Zahedan County, Sistan and Baluchestan Province, Iran. At the 2006 census, its population was 30, in 5 families.

References 

Populated places in Zahedan County